Device tracking software is software installed in an electronic device that is capable of reporting the device's location remotely. Depending upon the software and the device on which it is installed, the software may obtain the location of the device by means of GPS, WiFi-location, IP address, or accelerometer logs, and it may report the address by means of e-mail, SMS, or other means.

Some device tracking software is sold as part of a subscription to a staffed service that will assist the device's owner to update police officers with the device's location.

See also
 Geolocation software
 Hybrid positioning system
 Mobile phone tracking
 Bringrr
 Skyhook Wireless
 Laptop theft
 Prey (software)

References

Surveillance
Mobile software

Geopositioning